Edward Beck may refer to:
Edward Beck (British Army officer) (1880–1974)
Edward Beck (Jericho), a fictional character in the television drama series Jericho
Edward L. Beck, American Roman Catholic priest, television personality and writer 
Edward Beck (academic) (1848–1916), British academic
Ed Beck (1936–2019), American basketball player
Ted Beck, writer of All American Orgy